Sangina Baidya (born December 29, 1974, in Kathmandu) is a retired Nepalese taekwondo practitioner, who competed in the women's flyweight category. She retrieved a bronze medal in the 51-kg division at the 2000 Asian Taekwondo Championships in Hong Kong, China, and attained a seventh-place finish at the 2004 Summer Olympics, representing her nation Nepal. Before her sporting career ended in 2009, Baidya trained for Central Dojang Taekwondo Club in her native Kathmandu, under her personal coach Nastu Bahadur Bisural.

Career
Baidya started practicing taekwondo at the age of sixteen. Since then, she has obtained a total of ten national championship titles, and won fourteen medals (ten golds, a silver, and three bronzes) in twenty international tournaments between 1992 and 2001. Moreover, Baidya became a quarterfinalist in the women's flyweight class at the 1995 World Taekwondo Championships in Manila, Philippines, and accepted several prestigious awards for her full dedication to the sport, including three as the sportswoman of the year by Nepal Sports Journalist Forum (1996, 1997, and 2003).

Holding her distinction of becoming the nation's first ever taekwondo squad, Baidya qualified for the Nepalese squad in the women's flyweight class (49 kg) at the 2004 Summer Olympics in Athens. Earlier in the process, she placed third and booked her place on the Nepalese team from the Asian Olympic Qualifying Tournament in Bangkok, Thailand. She crashed out in an immediate 0–4 defeat to Chinese Taipei's Chen Shih-hsin in her opening match, but slipped directly into the repechage bracket for her chance of Nepal's first Olympic medal in history, following Chen's progress towards the final. In the repechage, Baidya fell short in her first playoff to Colombia's Gladys Mora with a 0–4 decision and a disputable one-point deduction for landing a kick on her opponent's head, relegating Baidya to seventh.

References

External links
 

1974 births
Living people
Nepalese female taekwondo practitioners
Olympic taekwondo practitioners of Nepal
Taekwondo practitioners at the 2004 Summer Olympics
Taekwondo practitioners at the 2002 Asian Games
Sportspeople from Kathmandu
Asian Games competitors for Nepal
Asian Taekwondo Championships medalists
21st-century Nepalese women